Drew Sarich (born August 24, 1975) is an American stage actor and singer songwriter from St. Louis, who performs in the English and German languages.

Biography
Sarich received a BFA in Musical Theatre with a concentration in Directing from Boston Conservatory in 1997. He made his Off-Broadway debut in Tony n' Tina's Wedding, followed by a tour as a backup singer for Liza Minnelli with the Cortes Alexander Trio. In 1998, he played Judas in a production of Jesus Christ Superstar in Nyack, New York, opposite Billy Porter.

In 1999, Sarich moved to Berlin to star as Quasimodo in the world premiere Der Glöckner von Notre Dame, in which he appeared for over 580 performances. In 2000, he released his first album, Say It, with his self-titled "Drew Sarich Band". He moved to Vienna and played Berger in the Vienna revival of Hair, Cousin Kevin in Tommy (Amstetten, Austria), and the title role in Hedwig and the Angry Inch (Berlin). He has also appeared in Lapdog and Wildcat in 2003, which he co-wrote with his wife, Ann Mandrella. Sarich has also performed at Donauinselfest Music Festival in Vienna (2001, 2002, 2003, 2004, 2009).

Sarich appeared in other musicals while in Europe. He played the title character(s) in Jekyll and Hyde in Cologne, followed by Sun/Master of the Keys in Barbarella (opened March 11, 2004) in Vienna. 

In St. Gallen he played the title role in Dracula, the Musical (sharing the role with Thomas Borchert).

Sarich made his Broadway debut in Spring 2006, when he took on the role of Armand in the musical Lestat. He had previously covered the roles of Armand and Lestat in the show's run in San Francisco while playing the role of Laurent, prior to taking over the role of Armand with the departure of Jack Noseworthy. Sarich played the title role for the two performances on May 27, 2006 (the day before Lestat'''s closing) when Hugh Panaro was out sick late in the production's run in New York. Lestat closed on May 28, 2006

In Summer 2006, Sarich took over for Rodney Hicks in the Off-Broadway show Jacques Brel is Alive and Well and Living in Paris, starring alongside Robert Cuccioli Natascia Diaz and Gay Marshall.

Sarich played the role of Grantaire (as well as the Innkeeper and a worker) in the Broadway revival of Les Misérables from October 2006 through the beginning of July 2007, understudying the roles of Enjolras and Javert. Later in July, following Alexander Gemignani's departure from the show, Sarich was chosen to take over the production's lead role of Jean Valjean until October 2007, when he traded locales with West End veteran John Owen-Jones. Sarich began as the West End Valjean on October 22, 2007, and Owen-Jones had his Broadway premiere as Valjean on October 23. Sarich's run in the London production ended on November 8, 2008.

Sarich has frequently performed as Jesus as well as Judas in Jesus Christ Superstar in numerous theaters in Austria and Germany.

2009 – 2010 Sarich premiered in the title role of Rudolf – Affaire Mayerling at the Raimund Theater in Vienna.Sarich took over as Graf von Krolock in the Vienna production of Tanz der Vampire. He made his debut  on 6 November 2010 and played the role until 2012 and then again in 2017 and 2018 in Vienna.

2011 he took on the role of Curtis Shank in the musical rendition of Sister Act in Vienna.  

2012 - 2015 Sarich performed the title role in the world premiere of Rocky das Musical in Hamburg.

In October 2013, he starred in a Vienna concert version of Andrew Lloyd Webber's Love Never Dies, translated entirely in German, as The Phantom.

2015 he sang together with Alfie Boe in Classic Quadrophenia – The Who at the Konzerthaus in Vienna.

In 2016 he played the role of Ché in Evita in Vienna's Ronacher theater. He played Jamie in The Last Five Years in Vienna in between 2018 and 2019. From 2017 until 2022 he played Antonio Vivaldi in Vivaldi – The Fifth Season / Vivaldi – Die fünfte Jahreszeit at the Volksoper Vienna. The composer Christian Kolonovits created this Ba-Rock Musical having Drew Sarich in mind for the role.

Between 2018 and 2022 Drew Sarich played at Volksoper Vienna: Robert Baker in Wonderful Town, Daddy Brubeck in Sweet Charity, The Wolf/Cinderella's Prince in Into the Woods and Albin/Zaza in La Cage aux Folles.

In January 2023, Sarich stars as Hedwig in Hedwig and the Angry Inch at the Vindobona in Vienna.

 Stage roles 

Discography

Cast Recordings

 Disneys “Der Glöckner von Notre Dame” original cast album 1999
 “Hair” Vienna cast recording 2001
 „Barbarella“ Vienna cast (limited edition) 2004
 “Jesus Christ Superstar” Vienna cast 2006
 “Rudolf – Affaire Mayerling” – cast album 2010
 “Jesus Christ Superstar” – live recording 2011
 „Tut Ankh Amon The Musical“ original Cairo cast 2011 HitSquad Records
 „Sister Act“ – original Vienna cast 2011
 “ROCKY – Das Musical” 2012
 „Die Moulin Rouge Story“ – Studio-Cast-CD 2015
 „Luther – Rebell Gottes“ 2016
 „Luna“ concept album 2017
 “Vivaldi – Die Fünfte Jahreszeit” original cast recording 2017
 „Tanz der Vampire – Die 3 Grafen“ 2018

The Lestat original Broadway cast recording was recorded by Mercury Records on May 22, 2006, at Sony Studios in New York City, but never released.

 Musical-DVD's 

 „Rudolf – Affaire Mayerling“ 2010
 „Vivaldi – Die Fünfte Jahreszeit“ 2017

Studio albums and EP's

 "Say It” Bassball Productions 2000
 „I.V.“ Drew Sarich and International Victim Soulmade Productions 2005
 “Silent Symphony” Endwerk Records 2011
 “Snowfall Single” Endwerk Records 2012
 “Let Him Go” Endwerk Records 2016
 “Secrets” Endwerk Records 2018
 “Hunting For Heaven” Endwerk Records 2019
 “Behave” EP Endwerk Records 2020
 “Cancel Christmas” Endwerk Records 2020
 „Wishes & Wonders“ Endwerk Records 2021
 „HILLS“ EP Statesman Sound 2022
 „Look Alive“ EP Statesman Sound 2022

Miscellaneous featuring Drew Sarich
 Varese Sarabande Records “Broadway sings Paul Simon” - "Bernadette" 1998
 Fred Eisler Camena to the Fallen (Guest Vocalist) 2005
 I Was Born To Love You (Rudolf - Affaire Mayerling promotional single featuring Lisa Antoni) (Vocalist) 2008
 More with every line - The music of Tim Prottey-Jones (Guest Vocalist) -"Rescue Remedy" 2010
 Move me (with Sonja Romei) 2011
 Come On Over (with Gabriela Ryffel - Mark Lanegan & Isobel Campbell cover, recorded at SAE Vienna) 2012
 Home, Christmas (with Gabriela Ryffel - Edward Sharpe and the Magnetic Zeros cover, recorded at SAE Vienna) 2012
 Nothin' Can Stop Me (Guest Vocalist on Bettina Meske's album "Made in Berlin") 2013
 Braucht uns ned wundern / No need to wonder (Guest Vocalist on Harald Baumgartner's album "Melancholerisch") 2014
 “FALCO: Coming HomeTribute” Live from the Donauinselfest 2017
„Joyful!“ Drew Sarich and Vienna's biggest christmas choir 2019
"Melody of Broadway, the texts of Wolfgang Adenberg“ 2020
„At the Movies“ Sound of Music Concerts 2021
„Nautilus – Ludwig Coss“ HitSquad Records PreCast 2022

 Awards 

 2017: Austrian musical theater Krone award  – for his role as Che in Evita
 2017: German musical theater award Deutscher Musical Theater Preis for his role as Antonio Vivaldi in Vivaldi – The Fifth Season 2018 BroadwayWorld Austria Award for his role as count Krolock in Dance of the Vampires
 2019 BroadwayWorld Austria Award for his role as Jesus in Jesus Christ Superstar''
 2020 BroadwayWorld Austria Award Vocalist of the decade

References

External links

 Drew Sarich: Official Website

American male musical theatre actors
Male actors from St. Louis
Boston Conservatory at Berklee alumni
Singer-songwriters from Missouri
1975 births
Living people